Guateque is a town and municipality in the Colombian Department of Boyacá, part of the subregion of the Eastern Boyacá Province. It borders the municipalities of La Capilla, Tenza, Sutatenza, Somondoco of Boyacá and Tibiritá and Manta of Cundinamarca.

Etymology 
Guateque is derived from the original name Guatoc, meaning "Stream of the ravine" or "Lord of the winds".

History 
In the centuries before the Spanish conquest of the Muisca, the central highlands of Colombia were inhabited by the Muisca. The Muisca practiced different rituals related to their religion. On the hill within the municipality that they called Guatoc, the people organized religious festivities. The cacique of Guateque was an important leader within the loose Muisca Confederation, as gold mining was executed in Guateque.

While catholic missionaries already were working in Guateque since 1556, the modern town was founded on January 28, 1636 by a group of Spanish leaders.

Economy 
Despite the urban character of Guateque, almost half of its economy is based on agriculture and livestock farming. Predominant agricultural products are maize and tomatoes.

Born in Guateque 
 Víctor Carranza, "the czar of emeralds"
 Francisco Estupiñán Heredia, politician
 Enrique Olaya Herrera, president of Colombia

Gallery

References 

Municipalities of Boyacá Department
Populated places established in 1636
1636 establishments in the Spanish Empire
Muisca Confederation